This is a list of stretch-curd cheeses, comprising cheeses prepared using the pasta filata technique. The cheeses manufactured from this technique undergo a plasticising and kneading treatment of the fresh curd in hot water, which gives them fibrous structures.

Stretch-curd cheeses

 Akkawi – a white brined cheese originating from the city of Acre (Akko), Israel. Its texture can be compared to mozzarella, feta or a mizithra, since it does not melt easily. The texture and flavor is a result of its specific culturing from its curds that are kept together for a prolonged period longer than simpler tasting curd cheese such as Syrian cheese when akkai is transformed into cheese.
 Braided cheese – made from strips of highly elastic cheese wound together in a braid. Turkey, Armenia, Lebanon, Syria, and many Latin American nations make varieties of braided cheese.
 Cacio figurato – a type of pasta filata cheese manufactured in Sicily, Italy made from cow's milk.
 Caciocavallo – is a type of pasta filata cheese made out of sheep's or cow's milk. It is produced throughout Southern Italy, particularly in the Apennine Mountains and in the Gargano peninsula. Shaped like a tear-drop, it is similar in taste to the aged Southern Italian Provolone cheese, with a hard edible rind.
 Galbanino – a soft, mild, cheese produced by the Italian company Galbani, it most closely resembles a mild provolone cheese.
 Halloumi – a Cypriot semihard, unripened, brined cheese made from a mixture of goat's and sheep's milk, and sometimes also cow's milk. It is set with rennet and is unusual in that no acid or acid-producing bacterium is used in its preparation.
 Kashkaval – a hard yellow cheese made of cow's milk, sheep's milk, or both. It dates to the 11th and 12th centuries, and is popular in several mediterranean countries.
 Moliterno – produced in a similar manner as caciocavallo
 Mozzarella – a traditionally southern Italian dairy product made by the pasta filata method. Mozzarella received a Traditional Speciality Guaranteed certification from the European Union in 1998. This protection scheme requires that mozzarella sold in the European Union is produced according to a traditional recipe.
 Bocconcini – small mozzarella cheese the size of an egg, it is prepared in the pasta filata manner by dipping curds into hot whey, and kneading, pulling and stretching.
 Buffalo mozzarella is made from the milk of Mediterranea Italiana buffalo. It is traditionally manufactured in Campania, especially in the provinces of Caserta and Salerno.
 Oaxaca cheese – a white, semihard cheese from Mexico, similar to un-aged Monterey Jack, but with a mozzarella-like string cheese texture. The production process is complicated and involves stretching the cheese into long ribbons and rolling it up like a ball of yarn.
 Oscypek is a smoked cheese made using salted sheep's milk and some cow's milk that is made exclusively in the Tatra Mountains region of Poland. Unpasteurized salted sheep's milk is first turned into cottage cheese, which is then repeatedly rinsed with boiling water and squeezed. After this, the mass is pressed into wooden, spindle-shaped forms in decorative shapes. The forms are then placed in a brine-filled barrel for a night or two, after which they are placed close to the roof in a special wooden hut and cured in hot smoke for up to 14 days.
 Oštiepok is a traditional smoked sheep's milk cheese made in Slovakia; it is a protected trade name under the EU's protected geographical indication.
 Pallone di Gravina is a firm cow's milk cheese from the regions of Basilicata and Apulia in southeast Italy. Today, however, production is centered in the province of Matera. 
 Palmito cheese is a semi-hard cow's milk cheese from Costa Rica.
 Parenica – a protected trade name under the EU's protected geographical indication, it is a traditional Slovak cheese that is semifirm, nonripening, semifat, steamed, and usually smoked, although a nonsmoked version is also produced.
Its taste varies significantly, from provolone piccante (sharp/piquant), aged for a minimum of four months and with a very sharp taste, to provolone dolce (sweet) with a very mild taste. In provolone piccante, the distinctive piquant taste is produced with lipase (enzyme) derived from goat. The Dolce version uses calf's lipase instead.
 Ragusano cheese is an Italian cow's milk cheese produced in Ragusa, in Sicily in southern Italy. It is a firm stretched-curd cheese made with whole milk from cows of the Modicana breed, raised exclusively on fresh grass or hay in the provinces of Ragusa and Syracuse. The cheese was awarded Italian Denominazione di Origine Controllata protection in 1955 and EU DOP status in 1995.
 Queso de mano  – Venezuelan soft, white cheese.
 Scamorza – an Italian stretched-curd cow's milk cheese, it can also be made from other milks, but this is less common. In its preparation, the fresh curd matures in its own whey for several hours to allow acidity to develop by the process of lactose being converted to lactic acid. Artisanal cheese makers generally form the cheese into a round shape, and then tie a string around the mass one-third of the distance from the top, and hang to dry. The resulting shape is pear-like.
 Stracciata – a fresh cow's milk pasta filata cheese produced in Italy, it is formed into flat strips of about 4–5 cm wide, 1 cm thick, and folded in on itself in a uniform manner or woven wire. The name stracciata means "tattered" in Italian.
 Stracciatella di bufala is a cheese produced from Italian buffalo milk in the province of Foggia, located in the southern Italian region of Apulia, using a stretching and a shredding technique.
 String cheese refers to several different types of cheese where the manufacturing process aligns the proteins in the cheese, which makes it stringy.
 Chechil is a brine string cheese that originated in Armenia. It has a consistency approximating that of mozzarella or sulguni, and is produced in the form of dense strings, rolled up in a figure eight of thick braid-shaped ropes. 
 Korbáčik is  a type of semihard or medium hard string cheese interwoven into fine braids. It originates from the Orava region of northern Slovakia. The two main variants of Korbáčik are smoked and unsmoked.
 Sulguni – a brined Georgian cheese from the Samegrelo region. It has a sour, moderately salty flavor, a dimpled texture, and an elastic consistency; these attributes are the result of the process used, and the source of its moniker "pickle cheese". The fried cheese is a popular dish in Georgia.
 Vastedda della valle del Belice – is one of the very few spun paste sheep's milk cheese. Produced in western Sicily, between the provinces of Palermo, Trapani and Agrigento, in the territories of the Belìce valley. 
Its taste is particular, typical of fresh sheep's cheese, with slightly acidic and never spicy characteristic.
Its texture is white, compact, with some streaks due to artisanal spinning. The characteristic focaccia shape, with its slightly convex faces, makes the Vastedda unforgettable. .

Gallery

See also

References

 
Lists of cheeses